The High Sheriff of County Londonderry is King Charles III's judicial representative in County Londonderry. Initially an office for lifetime, assigned by the ruling monarch, the High Sheriff became annually appointed from the Provisions of Oxford in 1258. Besides his judicial importance, he has ceremonial and administrative functions and executes High Court Writs.

History
The first (High) Shrivalties were established before the Norman Conquest in 1066 and date back to Saxon times. In 1908, an Order in Council made the Lord-Lieutenant the Sovereign's prime representative in a county and reduced the High Sheriff's precedence. Despite however that the office retains his responsibilities for the preservation of law and order in a county.

While the office of High Sheriff is present in the counties of Northern Ireland, it ceased to exist in those Irish counties which formed the Irish Free State in 1922.

High Sheriffs
1696: Robert Harvey of Londonderry
1780: Mossom Boyd (also Sheriff of City of Londonderry)
1817: James Major and Richard Harvey (also Sheriffs of City of Londonderry)
1818: John Thompson and Richard Babington (also Sheriffs of City of Londonderry)
1819: Thomas Kennedy  (also Sheriff of City of Londonderry)
1821: Joshua Gillespie and Marcus Gage (also Sheriffs of City of Londonderry)
1828: William Lenox-Conyngham (also Sheriff of City of Londonderry)
1829: 
1830:
1831:
1832:
1833: Anthony Babington of Creevagh (also Sheriff of City of Londonderry)
1834:
1835: Anthony Babington of Creevagh (also Sheriff of City of Londonderry)
1836: Henry Darcus and Archibald McCorkell of Glengalliagh (also Sheriff of City of Londonderry)
1842: Henry Richardson
1846: Henry Hervey Bruce
1846: John Barré Beresford, of Learmount
1848: John Stephenson of Fort William, Tobermore (also Sheriff of City of Londonderry)
1849: James Johnston Clark (also Sheriff of City of Londonderry)
1850: Robert Peel Dawson
1854: Robert Leslie Ogilby of Ardnargle
1857: William Edward Scott of Willsboro  
1858: Samuel Maxwell Alexander of Newtownlimavady (also Sheriff of City of Londonderry)
1859: William Fitzwilliam Lenox-Conyngham of Springhill House
1860: James Thomas Macky of Castlefin
1861: Rowley Miller of Moneymore
1862: John Adams of Ballydevitt
1863: George Skipton
1866: Conolly Thomas McCausland of Drenagh 
1867: James R. Montgomery 
1868: Henry Kyle of Laurel Hill
1869: Sir John Hill, 4th Baronet, of St. Colombs
1870: Robert Jackson Alexander
1871:
1873: Alexander Shuldham of Flowerfield  
1875: James Jackson Clark of Largantogher 
1877: Robert Lyon Moore
1878: Bartholomew McCorkell of Richmond 
1880: George Cather of Carrickhugh, Limavady
1882: Adolphus John Spencer Churchill Chichester
1883:
1886: Andrew Alexander Watt of Thorn Hill  
1887: Robert Alexander Ogilby of Pellipar, Dungiven  
1888: Conolly William Lecky Browne-Lecky of Derry 
1889:
1894: Bartholomew H. McCorkell of Richmond 
1895: John Cooke 
1898: John Arthur Wellesley O'Niell Torrens of Somerset, Co Londonderry

20th century

21st century

References

 
Londonderry County
History of County Londonderry